Pius Aeneas Gallant (February 1, 1882 – November 10, 1971) was a farmer, merchant and political figure on Prince Edward Island. He represented 1st Prince in the Legislative Assembly of Prince Edward Island from 1932 to 1943 as a Liberal.

He was born in Rustico, Prince Edward Island, the son of Dr. Isidore Gallant and Marguerite Campbell. He operated a store in Bloomfield Station for several years. In 1941, Gallant married Lillian-Mae MacAuland. He was accountant for the Falconwood Hospital in Charlottetown from 1943 to 1954. He died in Charlottetown at the age of 89.

References 
 

Prince Edward Island Liberal Party MLAs
1882 births
1971 deaths
People from Prince County, Prince Edward Island